Jan Gunnar Solli (born 19 April 1981, in Arendal) is a Norwegian footballer.

He has played as a right back for the most of his career, but also plays defensive midfielder and right winger.

Career

Norway

Solli made his senior debut for Odd Grenland in the 2000 Tippeligaen season and made five appearances, all as a substitute, in his first season. In total, he played 54 league games for the club over three and a half seasons – and helped Odd reach the 2002 Norwegian Cup Final, where they were beaten 1–0 by Vålerenga. His play with Odd Grenland led to interest from various European clubs including Aston Villa, and AC Milan, with which he had a training stint.

Solli joined Rosenborg of Trondheim in the summer of 2003 and made four starts and ten substitute appearances in the second half of that season as the club won a 12th consecutive league title. During his first season with Rosenborg he scored his first-ever league goal against Viking on 23 August 2003, in his fifth full season as a professional footballer. He was also a regular in the ensuing European campaigns for Rosenborg and scored an important first-leg goal against Maccabi Haifa in the UEFA Champions League third qualifying round in August 2004. He also played an integral role in helping Rosenborg win the 2004 and 2006 league title.

On 16 March 2007, Solli signed a three-year deal with Brann. Solli's first season for Brann was a huge success. In partnership with his former Rosenborg colleague Thorstein Helstad, he became an integral part of Brann's title winning squad, and earned a spot on Norway's national squad. During the 2009 season Solli's play with Brann once again led to him receiving interest from other European sides which included German Bundesliga side 1. FC Köln.

United States
Solli signed with Major League Soccer club New York Red Bulls on 24 January 2011. He made his official debut for New York on 19 March 2011, in the Red Bulls' 2011 MLS season opener, a 1–0 victory over Seattle Sounders FC. Solli made 33 official appearances in his first season for New York, playing primarily at right back. In his second season with the club, he scored his first goal for New York on 25 June 2012 in a 3-2 win over D.C. United. On 15 November 2012 New York announced that it would not offer Solli a contract extension, thus ending his tenure with the club.

Return to Europe
Solli signed with Vålerenga of Norway in February 2013. In March 2014 he signed with Swedish side Hammarby.

International
Solli made his debut for Norway in a friendly game against Scotland on 20 August 2003 and scored his only international goal in a 3–2 win against Russia on 28 April 2004. He was capped 40 times. Solli also represented Norway at Under-18 and U-21 level.

Club statistics

Honours

Norway
Norwegian Premier League: 2003, 2004, 2006 and 2007
Norwegian Cup: 2003

Individual
Norwegian Football Association Gold Watch

Music career
Solli is also an acknowledged disc jockey where he performs under the name DJ Solli. Solli has warmed up for Calvin Harris and David Guetta at Lavo, New York and Oslo Spektrum. He has also had gigs at Tryst Nightclub and XS Nightclub in Las Vegas. He has recently started his own music label, Sweet Harmony.

References

External links
 
 altomfotball.no
 SK Brann Profile
 home.no
 DJ Solli

1981 births
Living people
Norwegian footballers
Norwegian expatriate footballers
Norway international footballers
Norway under-21 international footballers
Odds BK players
Rosenborg BK players
SK Brann players
New York Red Bulls players
Vålerenga Fotball players
Eliteserien players
Allsvenskan players
Superettan players
Major League Soccer players
Expatriate soccer players in the United States
Expatriate footballers in Sweden
Norwegian expatriate sportspeople in the United States
Association football wingers
Association football midfielders
Association football defenders
People from Arendal
Sportspeople from Agder